The ATP Challenger Tour, in 2014 was the secondary professional tennis circuit organized by the ATP. The 2014 ATP Challenger Tour calendar comprised 150 tournaments, with prize money ranging from $40,000 up to $220,000, which represented an increase of the minimum prize money from $35,000. It was the 37th edition of challenger tournaments cycle, and 6th under the name of Challenger Tour.

Schedule 
This is the complete schedule of events on the 2014 calendar, with player progression documented from the quarterfinals stage.

January

February

March

April

May

June

July

August

September

October

November

Statistical information 
These tables present the number of singles (S) and doubles (D) titles won by each player and each nation during the season. The players/nations are sorted by: 1) total number of titles (a doubles title won by two players representing the same nation counts as only one win for the nation); 2) a singles > doubles hierarchy; 3) alphabetical order (by family names for players).

To avoid confusion and double counting, these tables should be updated only after an event is completed.

 As of 16 November 2014

Titles won by player

Titles won by nation

Point distribution 
Points are awarded as follows:

References

External links 

 Official website

 
ATP Challenger Tour
ATP Challenger Tour